Gerald Lynch may refer to:
Jerry Lynch (Gerald Thomas Lynch, 1930–2012), American baseballer
Gerald W. Lynch (1937–2013), American educator of criminal justice
Gerald J. Lynch (active since 1982), American professor of economics